The 1980–81 season was Colchester United's 39th season in their history and fourth successive season in third tier of English football, the Third Division. Alongside competing in the Third Division, the club also participated in the FA Cup and the League Cup.

On the back of the success of the previous season, Colchester crashed out of the Third Division, relegated in 22nd-position. Several winless streaks contributed to their downfall. In the cup competitions, the U's were defeated in the first round of the League Cup by Gillingham, while Watford overcame Colchester in the third round of the FA Cup.

Season overview
The club's chairman warned financial difficulties would result in an exodus of players, but in the summer months, only Steve Dowman left the club, joining Wrexham for £75,000. The club also received their first-ever shirt sponsorship from Royal London Insurance.

In the opening game of the season in the League Cup against Gillingham, debutant Nigel Crouch became the first Colchester player to the sent off on their debut following an altercation with Gillingham's Steve Bruce. Colchester failed to win any of their opening eight games. When they beat Millwall 3–0 in their ninth game, it attracted national media coverage. Sergeant Frank Ruggles of Essex Police marched on the field during play and attempted to arrest Millwall defender Mel Blyth for swearing.

Manager Bobby Roberts signed unknown Highland League player Kevin Bremner for a then-club record £25,000. Following this came six consecutive home wins, and Colchester were well-placed in the table by Christmas. However, after Trevor Lee moved to Gillingham for a club record deal worth £90,000, the U's form dipped and they began to slip down the table again. In response to this, on transfer deadline day, Roberts matched Colchester's record fee paid for Bremner, signing Roger Osborne from Ipswich Town, while also paying £15,000 each for Roy McDonough and Phil Coleman.

Eight games without a win from March to the penultimate game of the season ensured Colchester were relegated by just two points. Amid news of a 25,000 all-seater stadium development in the pipeline, the stark reality was that a new all-time low attendance of 1,430 witnessed the final day 1–0 win over Carlisle United, with a league average of just 2,641.

Despite relegation, Roberts was given a vote of confidence by the board, while the local Council refused the new stadium plans ensuring the U's would remain at Layer Road for the foreseeable future.

Players

Transfers

In

 Total spending:  ~ £80,000

Out

 Total incoming:  ~ £170,000

Loans out

Match details

Third Division

Results round by round

League table

Matches

League Cup

FA Cup

Squad statistics

Appearances and goals

|-
!colspan="14"|Players who appeared for Colchester who left during the season

|}

Goalscorers

Disciplinary record

Clean sheets
Number of games goalkeepers kept a clean sheet.

Player debuts
Players making their first-team Colchester United debut in a fully competitive match.

See also
List of Colchester United F.C. seasons

References

General
Books

Websites

Specific

1980-81
English football clubs 1980–81 season